Platonov or Platonaw is a surname. It may refer to:

People
Andrei Platonov (1899–1951), pen name of Andrei Platonovich Klimentov, Russian writer of the Soviet period
Denis Platonov (born 1981), Russian ice hockey player
Dzmitry Platonaw (born 1986), Belarusian footballer
Igor Platonov (1934–1995), Ukrainian-Soviet chess grandmaster
Oleg Platonov Russian writer
Pavel Platonaw (born 1986), Belarusian footballer
Sergey Platonov (1860–1933), Russian historian who led the official St Petersburg school of imperial historiography
Viacheslav Platonov (1939–2005), Russian volleyball player and coach
Vladimir Petrovich Platonov (born 1939) Russian-Belarusian mathematician
Yuriy Mihailovich Platonov, mayor of Rybnitsa, Transnistria

Play
Platonov (play), by Anton Chekhov